Dermoloma is a genus of fungi in the family Tricholomataceae. The widespread genus contains about 15 species.

Species
Dermoloma alexandri
Dermoloma aposcenum
Dermoloma atrobrunneum
Dermoloma bellerianum
Dermoloma coryleti
Dermoloma cuneifolium
Dermoloma cystidiatum
Dermoloma emiliae-dlouhyi
Dermoloma griseocameum
Dermoloma hemisphaericum
Dermoloma hybridum
Dermoloma hygrophorus
Dermoloma inconspicuum
Dermoloma intermedium
Dermoloma josserandii
Dermoloma longibasidiatum
Dermoloma magicum
Dermoloma murinellum
Dermoloma murinum
Dermoloma pataguae
Dermoloma pseudocuneifolium
Dermoloma pusillum
Dermoloma scotodes
Dermoloma yungense

See also

List of Tricholomataceae genera

References

Tricholomataceae
Agaricales genera
Taxa named by Josef Herink